Clawson may refer to:

Clawson (surname)
The travel cost method of economic valuation, also called the Clawson method

Places
In the United States
Clawson, Idaho, an unincorporated community
Clawson, Michigan, a city
Clawson, Utah, a town

Elsewhere
Long Clawson, a small village in Leicestershire, England, United Kingdom

See also
Clawson codes, an alphanumeric system of prioritizing and classifying 911 medical calls